Red columbine can refer to any red-flowered species in the flowering plant genus Aquilegia, especially:

Aquilegia canadensis (Canadian columbine)
Aquilegia formosa (crimson columbine), in particular variety truncata